Vickrey is a surname. Notable people with the surname include:

Dan Vickrey (born 1966), American musician
Jene Vickrey (born 1959), American politician
Robert Vickrey (1926–2011), American painter
William Vickrey (1914–1996), Canadian economist

See also
Vickrey auction, type of auction
Vickrey–Clarke–Groves auction, type of auction